Arthur Thomas Muggridge (7 December 1904 – 25 July 1933) was a British long-distance runner. He competed in the men's 10,000 metres at the 1928 Summer Olympics.

References

External links
 

1904 births
1933 deaths
Athletes (track and field) at the 1928 Summer Olympics
British male long-distance runners
Olympic athletes of Great Britain
Place of birth missing